The Order of Naval Merit Admiral Padilla is an order granted by Colombia, established by Decree 2409 of 8 July 1947. The order is awarded to Colombian Navy personnel to recognize acts of valor, heroic actions, outstanding and distinguished professional service, and exemplary discipline and fellowship of personnel.

Grades
The Order of Naval Merit Admiral Padilla is awarded in the following grades:
 Grand Cross (Gran Cruz)
 Grand Officer (Gran Oficial)
 Commander (Comendador)
 Officer (Oficial)
 Knight (Caballero)
 Companion (Compañero)

Recipients 

 Peter Pace
 Gary Roughead
 Chandrika Prasad Srivastava
 James G. Stavridis
 Fernando Tapias Stahelin
 Elmo Zumwalt

References

External links
CAPÍTULO IV. CONDECORACIONES POR VIRTUDES MILITARES Y PROFESIONALES DE CARÁCTER EXCEPCIONAL DE LAS ÓRDENES Y SU CONSEJO.

Orders, decorations, and medals of Colombia